This article lists some of the events that took place in Qatar in 2011.

Incumbents
Emir: Hamad bin Khalifa Al Thani
Prime Minister: Hamad bin Jassim bin Jaber Al Thani

Events

February 2-4: Ellen van Dijk wins the 2011 Ladies Tour of Qatar 
February 6-11: Mark Renshaw wins the 2011 Tour of Qatar
May 10: Qatari municipal elections, 2011

Deaths

References

 
Qatar
Years of the 21st century in Qatar
2010s in Qatar
Qatar